Vishal Senanayake (born 14 February 1996) is a Sri Lankan cricketer. He made his first-class debut for Sri Lanka Air Force Sports Club in Tier B of the 2016–17 Premier League Tournament on 2 December 2016.

References

External links
 

1996 births
Living people
Sri Lankan cricketers
Sri Lanka Air Force Sports Club cricketers
People from Moratuwa